Al Hamilton MBE is a Jamaican-born British journalist based in London. He was responsible for setting up the Commonwealth Sports Awards in 1980. He was awarded the MBE in the 2004 New Year Honours.

External links

References

British male journalists
Members of the Order of the British Empire
Year of birth missing (living people)
Place of birth missing (living people)
Living people
Jamaican emigrants to the United Kingdom